State Park is an unincorporated community in Richland County, South Carolina, United States. State Park has a post office with ZIP code 29147.

References

Unincorporated communities in Richland County, South Carolina
Unincorporated communities in South Carolina